Kristiano Samuel Armenteros Nunez Mendoza (born 27 May 1990), known as Samuel Armenteros, is a Swedish footballer who plays as a striker for Eerste Divisie club Heracles Almelo.

Club career
Born in Masthugget, Gothenburg, Sweden, to a Cuban father and a Swedish mother, Armenteros moved to the Netherlands at age 16 to join SC Heerenveen's youth system, and made it into the first team under head coach Gertjan Verbeek. He was successively released by Heerenveen in 2009, and later chose to rejoin Verbeek at Heracles Almelo, where he showed himself as a promising striker and managed to score his first Eredivisie goals.

In September 2015, Armenteros signed a two-year contract with reigning Azerbaijan Premier League Champions FK Qarabağ.

On 29 August 2016, Armenteros returned to Heracles Almelo, signing a one-year contract with the club.

Benevento
On 30 August 2017, Armenteros signed a contract with Serie A team Benevento. Armenteros struggled at Benevento, getting little playing time, and looked for a transfer in January 2018. Before departing for Benevento in August, he played 45 minutes for Heracles's B team while recovering from injury, meaning that he had officially played for two teams on the fall-through-spring league calendar. Under FIFA rules, he couldn't play for a third team that used that calendar, and any transfer would require going to a league that plays on a spring-to-fall calendar.

Loan to Portland Timbers
In February 2018, Armenteros was loaned by Benevento to Portland Timbers of Major League Soccer. He won MLS's Goal of the Week twice in a row in May 2018. His loan contract expired on 31 December 2018, and he returned to Benevento.

Loan to Crotone
On 30 January 2020, he joined Crotone on loan.

Fujairah
On 5 October 2020, Armenteros signed with Emirati club Fujairah.

Second return to Heracles Almelo
On 31 January 2022, Armenteros returned to Heracles Almelo until the end of the 2021–22 season, with an option to extend.

International career 
Having appeared for the Sweden U17, U19, and U21 teams a total of 18 times, Armenteros made his full international debut for Sweden on 13 June 2017 in a friendly 1–1 draw with Norway. He also scored first his international goal in that game, 13 minutes after coming on as a substitute for John Guidetti.

Armenteros made his competitive international debut for Sweden on 31 August 2017 in a 2018 FIFA World Cup qualifier against Bulgaria when he replaced Jakob Johansson in the 82nd minute of a 2–3 loss.

Personal life 
Born in Sweden, Armenteros is of Afro-Cubans descent.

Career statistics

Club

International

Scores and results list Sweden's goal tally first.

Honours

Anderlecht
Belgian First Division: 2012–13

 Qarabağ FK
Azerbaijan Premier League: 2015–16
Azerbaijan Cup: 2015-16

References

External links
 Samuel Armenteros at Voetbal International 
 

1990 births
Living people
Footballers from Gothenburg
Swedish people of Cuban descent
Association football forwards
Swedish footballers
Sweden international footballers
Sweden under-21 international footballers
Cuban footballers
SC Heerenveen players
Heracles Almelo players
R.S.C. Anderlecht players
Feyenoord players
Willem II (football club) players
Qarabağ FK players
Benevento Calcio players
Portland Timbers players
F.C. Crotone players
Fujairah FC players
Eredivisie players
Belgian Pro League players
Azerbaijan Premier League players
Serie A players
Serie B players
Major League Soccer players
UAE Pro League players
Swedish expatriate footballers
Cuban expatriate footballers
Expatriate footballers in the Netherlands
Expatriate footballers in Belgium
Expatriate footballers in Azerbaijan
Expatriate footballers in Italy
Expatriate soccer players in the United States
Expatriate footballers in the United Arab Emirates
Swedish expatriate sportspeople in the Netherlands
Swedish expatriate sportspeople in Belgium
Swedish expatriate sportspeople in Azerbaijan
Swedish expatriate sportspeople in Italy
Swedish expatriate sportspeople in the United States
Swedish expatriate sportspeople in the United Arab Emirates